Tania Haiböck (born March 3, 1978) is an Austrian triathlete who competed in the 2008 Summer Olympics.

In 2008, she finished 27th in the Olympic triathlon event.

External links
 official homepage 

1978 births
Living people
Austrian female triathletes
Olympic triathletes of Austria
Triathletes at the 2008 Summer Olympics
Place of birth missing (living people)
21st-century Austrian women